Sir Howard Bernstein (born 9 April 1953) was the Chief executive of Manchester City Council at Manchester Town Hall from 1998 to 2017. Originally joining the Council as a junior clerk, he became the Chief executive in 1998, responsible for setting development goals and encouraging investment in the city. He is Honorary Professor of Politics at The University of Manchester.

Early life
Bernstein is Jewish. He was born in Cheetham Hill and attended the Ducie High School.

History
Before appointment as Chief executive, Bernstein championed the Manchester Metrolink system. The system became the first light-rail network to be built in a British city for over a century when it opened in the early 1990s.

Bernstein has also supported the creation of new areas and buildings such as the Bridgewater Hall, the Manchester Velodrome, the Manchester Arena, the City of Manchester Stadium and the Sportcity district in east Manchester which is still growing. He was involved in the establishment of the Manchester Airports Group in the mid-1980s and has driven the expansion of the company. The Group is now the largest British owned airports group in the UK, owning four airports.

Bernstein's appointment followed the 1996 Manchester bombing which severely damaged much of the city centre and extensive reconstruction ensued. Following the terrorist bombing of the City Centre in 1996, he was appointed Chief executive of Manchester Millennium Limited, the public/private sector Task Force set up by the Government and the City Council to oversee the redesign and rebuilding of the City Centre, a task which successfully delivered areas such as Piccadilly Gardens, Exchange Square, New Cathedral Street, Urbis on time and on budget.

In 2003, Manchester City Council under Bernstein's civic leadership won the RIBA Client of the Year for various projects such the City of Manchester Stadium and Urbis – the only time a local government authority has won the award.

He was reckoned by the Health Service Journal to be the 21st most influential person in the English NHS in 2015 as a result of his central involvement in the reform of Healthcare in Greater Manchester. In March 2016 he was appointed the leader of the Greater Manchester Sustainability and transformation plan footprint. Later the same year, he announced his intention to retire in Spring 2017, his final day was 31 March 2017. He was succeeded by Joanne Roney in April 2017. He was made Honorary Professor of Politics at The University of Manchester on 3 April 2017.

In 2017, Bernstein was appointed Strategic Development Advisor at City Football Group, Manchester City F.C.'s parent company.

Other
Bernstein has a number of honorary degrees, including UMIST in 2003, University of Manchester in 2004, Manchester Metropolitan University in 2005. Sir Howard was knighted for his services to Manchester in the 2003 New Years Honours List following the successful hosting of the 2002 Commonwealth Games in Manchester. 

He was a member of the Olympic Delivery Authority, the body responsible for the delivery of venues in time for the 2012 Summer Olympics in London. He is president of Lancashire County Cricket Club and one of six honorary presidents of Manchester City F.C. Bernstein is a Vice President of the Jewish Leadership Council.

References

External links
Biography at policy review

1953 births
Living people
British chief executives
Knights Bachelor
Manchester City Council
People educated at Ducie Technical High School for Boys
Local government officers in England